American Indian Public High School is a charter school in Oakland, California (USA) and is part of the American Indian Model Schools charter school system. In 2011, the school ranked fourth in California in the Academic Performance Index (API). American Indian Public High School ranked first on a list in The Washington Post of the most challenging high schools in the United States. Approximately 77 percent of the school's students are from low-income households. It was ranked the 9th best charter school in the U.S. and the 38th best public high school in the U.S. by U.S. News & World Report in 2013.

References

External links
 American Indian Public High School website

Charter high schools in California
High schools in Oakland, California
Native American history of California
Educational institutions established in 2006
2006 establishments in California